The 2018 UIM F1 H2O World Championship was the 35th season of Formula 1 Powerboat racing.

Teams and drivers

Season calendar

Results and standings
Points are awarded to the top 10 classified finishers. A maximum of two boats per team are eligible for points in the teams' championship.

Drivers standings

References

External links
 
 The official website of the Union Internationale Motonautique

2018 in motorsport
2018
2018 in boat racing